M1 group is a diversified investment holdings group based in Beirut, Lebanon.  Its  CEO is Azmi Mikati.

Origin
The business was created in the early 1980s by Taha Mikati and Najib Mikati, the latter of whom became Prime Minister of Lebanon in 2005, 2011 and again in 2021.  It began in the construction sector.  During the 1980s it expanded into telecommunications and formed the basis of their flagship company Investcom. In 2005, Investcom employed more than 5000 people with a presence in ten countries across three continents.  Its gross earnings reached $660 million.  When listed on the London Stock Exchange and that of Dubai on 6 October 2005, it had a market capitalization of $3.3 billion and was among the largest companies in the middle east.

In June 2006, the South African company MTN bought Investcom for $5.5 billion, thereby becoming the first mobile phone corporation for the middle eastern market.

In 2007, the Mikati brothers founded M1 Group, which now comprises:
M1 limited, which holds a 10% stake in MTN
M1 Real Estate which owns real estate in Europe, the United States and the Middle East
M1 Fashion which owns several clothing brands including Façonnable, Pepe jeans and Hackett London
M1 Capital, which oversees the holding's financial assets and portfolios
M1 Enterprises, which main activity is to invest in various businesses across different sectors
M1 investments, which focuses on managing the holding's private equity funds
AREEBA, a financial technology company

In February 2010, M1 Group acquired 50% of the EFG-Hermes stake in the Lebanese Bank Audi, the largest bank in the country, for $450 million.

Myanmar
According to a UN-report from 2019, Irrawaddy Green Towers has business interest with the Myanmar military through Mytel, M1 Group, is one of the shareholders along with the International Finance Corporation (IFC) in Irrawaddy Green Towers. The Burma Campaign UK placed M1 Group, along with Google, Apple and many other international companies on their "dirty list", M1 was placed due to being "a major shareholder in Irrawaddy Green Towers, a mobile phone tower company which works for the military joint venture Mytel."

After the 2021 Myanmar coup d'état, the Military junta told  telecom companies in Myanmar that "they had until Monday July 5 to fully implement intercept technology they had previously been asked to install to let authorities spy on calls, messages and web traffic and to track users by themselves". Under these circumstances Telenor found it impossible to stay in the country, and proposed to sell its Myanmar business to the M1 group for $105 million.

References

Mikati family
Conglomerate companies established in 2007
Investment companies
2007 establishments in Lebanon